蜀 can refer to the following:

Various states that have existed within present-day Sichuan:
Shu (kingdom) (蜀国/蜀國 or 古蜀)
Shu Han (蜀汉/蜀漢), a state that existed during the Three Kingdoms Period in Chinese history
Cheng Han (成汉/成漢), also named Later Shu (后蜀/後蜀), one of the Sixteen Kingdoms
Western Shu (西蜀), also named Qiao Shu (谯蜀/譙蜀), one of the independent regime contemporaneous with the Eastern Jin
Former Shu (前蜀), one of the state of the Five Dynasties and Ten Kingdoms period
Later Shu (后蜀/後蜀), one of the state of the Five Dynasties and Ten Kingdoms period
An abbreviation for modern Sichuan Province, People's Republic of China

See also
 Shu (disambiguation)

Disambiguation pages with Chinese character titles